Edward Blount may refer to:

Edward Blount (1565–1632), English publisher
Edward Blount, 2nd Baron Mountjoy (1464–1475), English peer
Edward Blount (MP) (1769–1843), Member of Parliament for Steyning
Edward Charles Blount (1809–1905), English promoter of French railways
 Sir Edward Blount, 4th Baronet (died 1758) of the Blount baronets
 Sir Edward Blount, 5th Baronet (c. 1724–1765) of the Blount baronets
 Sir Edward Blount, 8th Baronet (1795–1881) of the Blount baronets
 Sir Edward Robert Blount, 11th Baronet (1884–1978) of the Blount baronets

See also
Edward Blunt (disambiguation)